Lesbian tourism may refer to:
LGBT tourism, a form of tourism marketed to lesbian, gay, bisexual, and transgender (LGBT) people
Lesbos#Tourism, tourism on the Greek island of Lesbos